The Women's 4×100 Medley Relay  at the 10th FINA World Swimming Championships (25m) was swum on 17 December 2010 in Dubai, United Arab Emirates. 21 nations swam in the preliminary heats, with the top-8 advancing to swim again in the final.

Records
Prior to the competition, the existing world and championship records were as follows.

The following records were established during the competition:

Results

Heats

Final

References

Medley relay 4x100 metre, Women's
World Short Course Swimming Championships
2010 in women's swimming